Calderón de la Barca may refer to:
 Ángel Calderón de la Barca y Belgrano
 Carlos Calderón de la Barca
 Fernando Calderón de la Barca, 1st Marquis of Reinosa
 Frances Erskine Inglis, 1st Marquise of Calderón de la Barca
 Pedro Calderón de la Barca, dramatist of the Spanish Golden Age.
 Saturnino Calderón de la Barca y Collantes
 Vicente Calderón de la Barca